This is a list of universities in Nauru.

Universities 
 University of the South Pacific (Nauru campus)

See also 
 List of universities by country

References

Nauru
Nauru
Universities